John Notyngham (died 20 December 1418) was a Canon of Windsor from 1387 - 1389 and Dean of Hastings.

Career

He was appointed:
Chancellor of Hereford 1384, 1386
Prebendary of Lichfield 1387, 1397, 1398
Prebendary of Colworth in Chichester 1397
Prebendary of Chiswick in St Paul's 1406 - 1418
Treasurer of York 1415
Dean of Hastings

He was appointed to the fourth stall in St George's Chapel, Windsor Castle in 1387, and held the stall until 1389.

Notes 

1418 deaths
Canons of Windsor
Year of birth missing